Folketanken was a Norwegian newspaper, published in Risør in Aust-Agder county.

Folketanken was started in 1888. It went defunct in 1945.

References

1888 establishments in Norway
1945 disestablishments in Norway
Mass media in Aust-Agder
Defunct newspapers published in Norway
Norwegian-language newspapers
Publications established in 1888
Publications disestablished in 1945
Risør